D'où viens-tu, bergère? ("Where are you coming from, shepherdess?") is a traditional French carol. Written in 4-4 time, this carol is sung to celebrate Christmas in France.

In its English translation Mary Magdalene comes from visiting the manger of Jesus and tells the shepherds and angels of his birth. The carol is a popular choice for francophone choirs internationally, especially in Canada.

Lyrics for D’où viens-tu, bergère were published in Vieilles Chansons patoises du Périgord (1888, 2e éd. 1903) as collected by Emmanuel Casse and Eugène Chaminade.

Partial traditional lyrics
D'où viens-tu, bergère ?
D'où viens-tu?
Je viens de l'étable
De m'y promener!
J'ai vu un miracle,
Ce soir arriver!

Rien de plus, bergère ?
Rien de plus?
Y'a le boeuf et l'âne,
Qui sont par devant,
Avec leur haleine
Réchauffant l'enfant.

The carol is usually repeated 2 times, and traditionally, is accompanied by harpsichord and oboe.

English adaption
What did you see Oh Maiden, What did you see? 
On this very night, my own eyes were dazzled, by a wondrous sight! 
Was he fair, Oh Maiden, Was he fair? 
Fairer than the moon, fairer than the sun! Never in this world have I seen such a one! 
Was he calm, Oh Maiden, was he calm? 
All my heart was given to this little child. In my very soul, he will live for all time!

Adaptations
The song was adapted in 1866 into English by William McLennan with the title Whence art thou, my maiden?

Recorded versions
Artists who have recorded the song include:
Benny Barbara (nell'album Tijuana)
 The Canadian Brass (in The Christmas Album) 1990
 Le Petit Chœur Du Collège De Montreux e Charles Jauquier (nell'album L'ésprit de Noël)
Suzanne Pinel (nell'album Noël avec Suzanne Pinel 1983)
Laurens van Rooyen (nell'album Appelsientje Kerstconcert 1991)
Nathalie Simard e Les Petits Chanteurs de Granby (nell'album Noël avec Nathalie et Les Petits Chanteurs de Granby 1981)
 Strada (nell'album Kadou - Noëls anciens et chansons de quête Traditional Carols And Wassail Songs 2000)
 Joyce Sullivan e Charles Jordan (nell'album Folk Songs of Canada)

See also
 List of Christmas carols

References

External links

Lyrics, Francophone Musique
Lyrics, The Great Canadian Songbook

Songs about shepherds
French folk songs
French songs
French-language Christmas carols